Lindsey Ann German (born 1951) is a British left-wing political activist. A founding member and convenor of the British anti-war organisation Stop the War Coalition, she was formerly a member of the Socialist Workers Party, sitting on its central committee and editor of its magazine, Socialist Review.

German has twice stood as a left-wing candidate for Mayor of London, coming fifth in 2004, and as the Left List mayoral candidate in the May 2008 elections. In February 2010, following "increasing disenchantment" with the leadership, she resigned from the SWP, after 37 years' membership.

Early life and activities 
Lindsey German was born in London in 1951 and educated in Hillingdon at Vyners, then a grammar school. In 1970 she attended the "Stop the '70 Tour" demonstration organised by Peter Hain against the tour of the all-white South African cricket team.

German joined the International Socialists (later the Socialist Workers Party) in 1972, the same year she began to read law at the London School of Economics. She was active in the original National Abortion Campaign in April 1975, then responding to a parliamentary private member's bill put forward by Glasgow Labour MP James White, and was involved in campaigns to achieve equal pay for women. German had become a full-time official by 1977 for what was now the Socialist Workers Party and a member of the party's central committee.

Stop the War and Respect 

German was involved in setting up the Stop the War Coalition in September 2001. It was established to oppose the war in Afghanistan and later Iraq. German became convenor of the Stop the War Coalition, speaking at meetings and demonstrations.

In January 2004, German supported the move to form Respect – The Unity Coalition, which included the SWP and other opponents of the war in Iraq, including Muslim groups and which stood as a left alternative to the Labour Party in elections. At the SWP's Marxism 2003 event she commented: "I'm in favour of defending gay rights, [...] but I am not prepared to have it as a shibboleth, [created by] people who . . . regard the state of Israel as somehow a viable presence."

She was Respect's candidate for the London Mayoral election in June 2004, in addition to being first in the list for election to the London Assembly. She came 5th in the mayoral election with 63,294 first and second preference votes (3.3% of the total) and in the assembly election came just below the 5% threshold in the top-up section (the assembly election followed the Additional Member System) which would have gained her a seat on the assembly. In the 2005 general election she was the Respect candidate for the West Ham, London, constituency and came second with 19.5% of the vote.

Departure from SWP 
On 18 April 2007 she was selected as Respect's candidate for the 2008 London Mayoral election. However, a subsequent split within the organisation meant that German was not able to use the party's name in the election. Instead German stood as the candidate for Mayor and the assembly under the Left List name, the SWP part of Respect, finishing in eighth place in the election to be mayor with 16,796 votes on first preference.

According to journalist John Anderson, German was a leading figure promoting further ties between the SWP and various "reactionary Islamists" such as the Muslim Association of Britain and the British Muslim Initiative. 

German's employment by the SWP lasted until the January 2009 SWP party conference. At that conference the proposed slate did not include John Rees, German's partner and another long-standing member of the Central Committee (CC). German proposed an alternative slate which did include Rees. When it became clear this would be overwhelmingly defeated, German and Chris Nineham withdrew their names from the election and were not selected. As the Central Committee slate was the only proposed slate that went to the vote at conference she was not re-elected to the SWP's Central Committee in 2009. In 2010, German resigned from the SWP.

German was the editor of the party's monthly magazine, Socialist Review, from 1984 until April 2004.

Post-SWP
She has written several books, including two on women's rights and A People's History of London, co-written with her partner, John Rees.

In August 2015, German endorsed Jeremy Corbyn's campaign in the Labour Party leadership election.

In 2019, German wrote that there was little evidence for an epidemic of antisemitism within the Labour Party, with a "very small number of cases proved, and a small number of accusations made". She wrote that such allegations  were "political attacks - against Corbyn and his left wing politics, and against all those who criticise the state of Israel for its treatment of the Palestinians. These are the real reasons for their scale and ferocity, and why they are taken up with such enthusiasm by the BBC and the rest of the media."

In 2022, in response to the prelude to the 2022 Russian invasion of Ukraine, German wrote an opinion piece in the Guardian criticising Labour Party Leader Keir Starmer's support of the NATO alliance.

Selected books

Selected articles
"Frederick Engels", International Socialism, 2:65, 1994
"Theories of Patriarchy", International Socialism, 2:12, 1981
"Reflections on the Communist Manifesto", International Socialism, 2:79, 1998

References

External links
 Lindsey German's writings for the Stop the War Coalition
 Lindsey German speaking at Don't Attack Iran protest - 26 June 2019. Published/uploaded on YouTube on 28 June 2019, by Stop the War Coalition.
 Lindsey German Internet Archive
 On Campaign Trail German's blog of her May 2005 election campaign

1951 births
Living people
British anti-war activists
British feminists
British journalists
British political writers
Politicians from London
Respect Party parliamentary candidates
Socialist Workers Party (UK) members
British socialist feminists
Writers from London
British political party founders